Rocío Gálvez Luna (born 14 April 1997) is a Spanish professional footballer who plays as a centre back for Liga F club Real Madrid CF and the Spain women's national team.

Honours

Club
 Atlético de Madrid
 Primera División: Winner 2016–17
 Copa de la Reina de Fútbol: Winner 2016, Runner-up 2017

International
 Spain (youth)
 UEFA Women's Under-17 Championship: Runner-Up: 2014
 UEFA Women's Under-19 Championship: Runner-Up: 2015

Spain
 Cyprus Cup: Winner, 2018

References

External links
 
 Rocío Gálvez at Liga de Fútbol Profesional

1997 births
Living people
Footballers from Córdoba, Spain
Spanish women's footballers
Women's association football defenders
Real Betis Féminas players
Atlético Madrid Femenino players
Levante UD Femenino players
Primera División (women) players
Spain women's youth international footballers
21st-century Spanish women